The Board of Intermediate and Secondary Education, Peshawar or BISE Peshawar is a government examinations conducting and assessment body on intermediate and secondary education levels located in Peshawar, Khyber Pakhtunkhwa, Pakistan.

History 
BISE Peshawar was established in 1961 by the Government of Khyber Pakhtunkhwa. Previously, it was conducting the examination of intermediate and secondary education for the whole Khyber Pakhtunkhwa province but later, new educational boards were established in Khyber Pakhtunkhwa by the government and now its jurisdiction is Peshawar Division.

Jurisdiction 
The jurisdiction of Peshawar board includes the following districts:
 Mohmand District
Charsadda District
 Chitral District
 Peshawar District
Khyber District

See also 
 List of educational boards in Pakistan
 Federal Board of Intermediate and Secondary Education, Islamabad
 Board of Intermediate and Secondary Education, Abbottabad

References

External links 
 

Education boards in Khyber Pakhtunkhwa